Drasteria aberrans is a moth of the family Erebidae. It is found in central Asia (Kyrghyzstan, Turkmenistan, Tadjikistan, Uzbekistan, Mongolia and China (Xinjiang)).

References

Drasteria
Moths described in 1888
Moths of Asia